Hamilton Othanel Smith (born August 23, 1931) is an American microbiologist and Nobel laureate.

Smith was born on August 23, 1931, and graduated from University Laboratory High School of Urbana, Illinois. He attended the University of Illinois at Urbana-Champaign, but in 1950 transferred to the University of California, Berkeley, where he earned his B.A. in Mathematics in 1952 .  He received his medical degree from Johns Hopkins School of Medicine in 1956. Between 1956 and 1957 Smith worked for the Washington University in St. Louis Medical Service. In 1975, he was awarded a Guggenheim Fellowship he spent at the University of Zurich.

In 1970, Smith and Kent W. Wilcox discovered the first type II restriction enzyme, that is now called as HindII. Smith went on to discover DNA methylases that constitute the other half of the bacterial host restriction and modification systems, as hypothesized by Werner Arber of Switzerland.

He was awarded the Nobel Prize in Physiology or Medicine in 1978 for discovering type II restriction enzymes with Werner Arber and Daniel Nathans as co-recipients.

He later became a leading figure in the nascent field of genomics, when in 1995 he and a team at The Institute for Genomic Research sequenced the first bacterial genome, that of Haemophilus influenzae. H. influenza was the same organism in which Smith had discovered restriction enzymes in the late 1960s.  He subsequently played a key role in the sequencing of many of the early genomes at The Institute for Genomic Research, and in the assembly of the human genome at Celera Genomics, which he joined when it was founded in 1998.

More recently, he has directed a team at the J. Craig Venter Institute that works towards creating a partially synthetic bacterium, Mycoplasma laboratorium. In 2003 the same group synthetically assembled the genome of a virus, Phi X 174 bacteriophage. Smith is scientific director of privately held Synthetic Genomics, which was founded in 2005 by Craig Venter to continue this work. Synthetic Genomics is working to produce biofuels on an industrial-scale using recombinant algae and other microorganisms.

References
This article incorporates CC-BY-2.5 text from the reference

Further reading

External links

American microbiologists
Members of the United States National Academy of Sciences
21st-century American biologists
Phage workers
Nobel laureates in Physiology or Medicine
American Nobel laureates
University of California, Berkeley alumni
Johns Hopkins University alumni
Nobel laureates affiliated with Missouri
1931 births
Living people
University Laboratory High School (Urbana, Illinois) alumni
Biotechnologists
Human Genome Project scientists
Washington University School of Medicine faculty